MLS Comeback Player of the Year is a Major League Soccer award established in 2000.  The award is voted on by media, MLS players and club management.  It is presented to a player who showed impressive improvement after overcoming a serious injury or medical condition or after a previous slump in the career.

Winners

References 

Comeback Player of the Year